Roger Bancroft Westley (21 March 1947 – 12 May 1982) was an English cricketer.  Westley was a right-handed batsman who bowled right-arm off break.  He was born in Preston, Lancashire and was educated at Lancaster Royal Grammar School.

Westley studied first at Durham University and continued his education at Corpus Christi College, Oxford. He made his first-class debut for Oxford University against Lancashire in 1969.  He made 4 further first-class appearances for the university, all coming in 1969, with the last of which coming against Middlesex.  In his 5 first-class appearances, he scored 32 runs at an average of 4.57, with a high score of 14.  With the ball, he took 4 wickets at an expensive bowling average of 67.50, with best figures of 2/65.

Westley and his twin brother Stuart both played for Oxford University in first-class cricket, one of the few times twins have appeared together in first-class cricket.  He later became a cricket coach at Haileybury College. Westley died in Hertford Heath, Hertfordshire on 15 May 1982, aged just 35.

References

External links
Roger Westley at ESPNcricinfo
Roger Westley at CricketArchive

1947 births
1982 deaths
Alumni of Corpus Christi College, Oxford
Cricketers from Preston, Lancashire
English cricket coaches
English cricketers
Oxford University cricketers
People educated at Lancaster Royal Grammar School
Schoolteachers from Lancashire
English twins
Twin sportspeople
Alumni of Durham University